Dumisani Magala (born 22 November 1994) is a South African cricketer. He made his first-class debut for Eastern Province in the 2016–17 Sunfoil 3-Day Cup on 12 January 2017. He made his List A debut for Eastern Province in the 2016–17 CSA Provincial One-Day Challenge on 12 February 2017.

References

External links
 

1994 births
Living people
South African cricketers
Eastern Province cricketers
Place of birth missing (living people)